Khawaja Fareed Government Post Graduate College, Rahim Yar Khan, located in the heart of the city Rahim Yar Khan, Punjab, Pakistan.  It is named after a Muslim Saraiki saint and poet, Khwaja Ghulam Farid.

Mission
 Provide good education
 Team Building
 Growth
 Quenching thirst for knowledge
 Self-respect

History
The state of Bahawalpur laid down the foundation of the college in the city's “Town Hall” in 1948. In its infancy, it consisted of only three rooms. The college was shifted to the present building in 1954. It became a degree college in 1962. A resolution was passed in the National Assembly in 1970 regarding its name. It was named after the famous Sufi Poet Khawaja Ghulam Fareed. 
The classes for post graduate studies in English, Urdu, Economics and Political Science were introduced in 1995. In 2012 the college  started 09 programs which include M.Sc. Physics, Chemistry, Botany, Zoology, Mathematics, M.A International Relations, Islamiat, M.Ed. and B.Ed. In 2017 & 2018 the college started 08 BS-04 Year Programs in the Subjects of Chemistry, Botany, Zoology, Physics, Mathematics, Economics, Urdu and English with vary low fee structure as compare to other Universities. In the near future, the college administration plans to start even more BS-programs for this institution.

Programs offered
Intermediate Classes (Only for Boys)
 F. Sc. (Pre-Medical)
 F. Sc. (Pre- Engineering)
 F. A. (All Combinations of Arts Subjects)
 I.C.S (All Combinations)
02 Year Degree Programs (After Intermediate) ( Only for Boys)
 B.Sc. (Pre-Engineering)
 B.Sc. (Zoology, Botany, Chemistry)
 B. A. (All Combinations of Arts Subjects)
 B.Sc. Computer Sciences
Postgraduate 02 Year Programs (After Graduation) Co-Education
 M.A English (2 years)
 M.A Economics (2 years)
 M.A Political Science (2 years)
 M.A Urdu (2 years)
 M.A International Relations (IR) (2 Years)
 M.Sc Botany (2 years)
 M.Sc Zoology (2 years)
 M.Sc Physics (2 years)
 M.Sc Chemistry (2 years)
 M.Sc Mathematics (2 years)
 B.Ed (1.5 year 03 Semesters, After Post-graduation)
 M.Ed (1 year)
BS 04 Year Programs After Intermediate (Co-Education)
 BS Chemistry (4 years)
 BS Zoology (4 years)
 BS Mathematics (4 years)
 BS Botany (4 years)
 BS Physics (4 years)
 BS Computer Science (4 years)
 BS Economics (4 years)
 BS English (4 years)
 BS Urdu (4 years)'''
 And Other Basics

Facilities
 Hostels
 Cafeteria
 Bookshop
 Playing grounds for soccer, hockey, and cricket
 IT Lab
 Transport
 Library
 Masjid
 Sub-campus Islamia University, Bahawalpur

See also
 Khawaja Farid Govt. Post Graduate College Rahim Yar Khan
 Rahim Yar Khan
 Shaikh Zayed Medical College, Rahim Yar Khan

References
http://kfgc.edu.pk

External links
 Official Website
 City website

Rahim Yar Khan
P

ur:زمرہ:پنجاب میں تعلیم